Nosratabad (also Romanized as Noşratābād; also known as Tapahsī Dalīk, Tapasi Dalik, Tappah Sīdalīk, Tappehsī Dalīk, and Tapsi Dalik) is a village in Gejlarat-e Sharqi Rural District, Aras District, Poldasht County, West Azerbaijan Province, Iran. At the 2006 census, its population was 388, in 82 families.

References 

Populated places in Poldasht County